Tiina is an Estonian and Finnish feminine given name.

People named Tiina include:
Tiina Ala-aho (born 19??), Finnish Paralympic track and field athlete
Tiina Benno (born 1961), Estonian politician
Tiina Intelmann (born 1963), Estonian diplomat
Tiina Kaalep (born 1964), Estonian journalist, broadcast and media manager
Tiina Kangro (born 1961), Estonian journalist and politician
Tiina Kankaanpää (born 1976), Finnish discus thrower
Tiina Kapper (1895–1947), Estonian dancer and dance pedagogue
Tiina Lillak (born 1961), Finnish javelin thrower
Tiina Lokk (born 1955), Estonian filmmaker, film teacher and politician
Tiina Lymi (born 1971), Finnish actress, director, screenwriter and author
Tiina Mälberg (born 1970), Estonian actress
Tiina Nieminen (born 1979), Finnish racing cyclist
Tiina Nunnally (born 1952), American author and translator
Tiina Oraste (born 1962), Estonian politician
Tiina Puumalainen (born 1966), Finnish theatre director and a playwright
Tiina Ranne (born 1994), Finnish ice hockey player
Tiina Rosenberg (born 1958), Swedish educator and politician
Tiina Saario (born 1982), Finnish footballer
Tiina Salmén (born 1984), Finnish footballer 
Tiina Sanila (born 1983), Finnish musician
Tiina Sten (born 1985), Finnish basketball player
Tiina Tauraite (born 1976), Estonian actress
Tiina Trutsi (born 1994), Estonian football player
Tiina Wilén-Jäppinen (1963–2016), Finnish politician

References

Estonian feminine given names
Finnish feminine given names